Galiano is a surname. Notable people with the surname include:

Dionisio Alcalá Galiano (1760–1805), Spanish naval officer, cartographer and explorer
María Elena Galiano (1928–2000), Argentine arachnologist
Mateus Galiano da Costa (born 1984), Angolan footballer
Phil Galiano, American football coach